School of Rock (titled onscreen as The School of Rock) is a 2003 American comedy film directed by Richard Linklater, produced by Scott Rudin, and written by Mike White. The film stars Jack Black, Joan Cusack, Mike White and Sarah Silverman. Black plays struggling rock guitarist Dewey Finn, who is fired from his band and subsequently poses as a substitute teacher at a prestigious prep school. After witnessing the musical talent of the students, Dewey forms a band of fourth-graders to attempt to win the upcoming Battle of the Bands and use his winnings to pay his rent.

School of Rock was released on October 3, 2003, by Paramount Pictures, grossing $131 million worldwide on a $35 million budget. The film received positive reviews from critics, with praise for Black's performance and humor. It was the highest-grossing music-themed comedy of all time until the release of Pitch Perfect 2 in 2015. A stage musical adaptation opened on Broadway in December 2015, and a television adaptation for Nickelodeon premiered on March 12, 2016.

Plot

Rock band No Vacancy performs at a nightclub three weeks before auditioning for the Battle of the Bands. Guitarist Dewey Finn creates on-stage antics, including a stage dive that abruptly ends the performance. The next morning, Dewey's roommate Ned Schneebly and Ned's domineering girlfriend, Patty Di Marco, inform Dewey he must either pay his overdue share of the rent or move out. When Dewey meets No Vacancy at a rehearsal session, he is informed that he has been fired from the band and replaced by another guitarist, Spider. Later, while trying to sell some of his equipment, Dewey answers a phone call from Rosalie Mullins, the principal of the Horace Green prep school, inquiring for Ned about a short-term position as a substitute teacher. Desperate for money, Dewey impersonates Ned and is hired. On his first day at the school, Dewey, who does not know how to spell "Schneebly", adopts the name "Mr. S" and spends the day behaving erratically, much to the students' confusion.

The next day, after observing the students' talent in music class, Dewey devises a plan to form a new band to audition for Battle of the Bands. He casts Zack Mooneyham as lead guitarist, Freddy Jones as drummer, cello player Katie on bass, pianist Lawrence on keyboards, and himself as lead vocalist and guitarist. He assigns the rest of the class to various roles of co-lead and backup singers, groupies and roadies, with overachiever Summer Hathaway as band manager. The project takes over normal lessons, but helps the students to embrace their talents and overcome their insecurities, as well as realizing that rock and roll can help them stand up for themselves. Dewey reassures Lawrence, who is worried about not being cool enough for the band, Zack, whose overbearing father disapproves of rock, and Tomika, an overweight girl who is too self-conscious to audition for co-lead and backup singer despite having a powerful voice. Band "groupies" Michelle and Eleni, with Summer's approval, name the band "The School of Rock".

Dewey sneaks the key band members out of school to audition for Battle of the Bands while the rest of the class stay behind to maintain cover. The group is rejected because the bill is full, but are accepted after Summer tricks the staff into thinking that the kids are terminally ill. The next day, Rosalie decides to check on Dewey's teaching progress, forcing Dewey to teach the students actual academic material. The day before Battle of the Bands, a parents' night takes place at the school, during which the parents question Dewey's teaching methods. That same night, Ned receives a paycheck from the school via mail and realizes that Dewey impersonated him. He, Patty and the police arrive at the school and confront him. When Rosalie arrives, Dewey reveals his true identity and admits he is not a licensed teacher before fleeing. Back at home, a disappointed Ned reluctantly evicts Dewey as punishment for impersonating him.

The next morning, the parents angrily confront Rosalie at her office. Not wanting their hard work to go to waste, the kids sneak out of the school. When the new substitute discovers that the kids are missing, Rosalie and the parents race to Battle of the Bands, but are forced to buy tickets in order to enter. A school bus comes to pick up Dewey, who leads the kids to the competition and decides that they should play a song Zack had written earlier. Meanwhile, Ned finally stands up to Patty and goes to see the School of Rock perform. Initially dismissed as a gimmick, the band wins over the entire crowd. Much to Dewey's disappointment, No Vacancy wins, but the audience chants for School of Rock and demands an encore. While upset at the deception, the parents admit to being impressed by the kids' talent and confidence on stage, alongside Rosalie becoming ecstatic.

Some time later, an after-school program known as the School of Rock opens and Summer obtains many offers for shows and record deals from the band. Dewey continues to coach the students he played with before, while Ned, who has rediscovered his passion for rock music, teaches beginner students.

Cast

 Jack Black as Dewey Finn (lead and backing vocals, rhythm guitar), an energetic, down-on-his-luck guitarist slacker who becomes a substitute teacher.
 Joan Cusack as Rosalie "Roz" Mullins, the overworked principal of the Horace Green prep school who secretly loves rock music.
 Mike White as Ned Schneebly, Dewey's responsible but submissive roommate and best friend, who formerly dreamed of being a rock star, but gave up.
 Sarah Silverman as Patty Di Marco, Ned's domineering girlfriend
 Miranda Cosgrove as Summer "Tinkerbell" Hathaway (band manager), the class factotum
 Joey Gaydos Jr. as Zack "Zack-Attack" Mooneyham (lead guitar)
 Kevin Clark as Freddy "Spazzy McGee" Jones (drums)
 Rivkah Reyes as Katie "Posh Spice" (bass)
 Robert Tsai as Lawrence "Mr. Cool" (keyboards)
 Maryam Hassan as Tomika "Turkey Sub" (lead and backing vocals)
 Aleisha Allen as Alicia "Brace Face" (lead and backing vocals)
 Caitlin Hale as Marta "Blondie" (lead and backing vocals)
 Brian Falduto as Billy "Fancy Pants" (band stylist)
 Z Infante as Gordon "Roadrunner" (assistant, lights)
 James Hosey as Marco "Carrot Top" (assistant, special effects)
 Angelo Massagli as Frankie "Tough Guy" (security)
 Cole Hawkins as Leonard "Short Stop" (security)
 Jordan-Claire Green as Michelle (groupie)
 Veronica Afflerbach as Eleni (groupie)
 Adam Pascal as Theo (lead vocals, rhythm guitar)
 Lucas Babin as Spider (lead guitar)
 Lucas Papaelias as Neil (bass, backing vocals)
 Chris Stack as Doug (drums)
 Frank Whaley as Battle of the Bands director (uncredited)

Production
Screenwriter Mike White's concept for the film was inspired by The Langley Schools Music Project. Jack Black once witnessed a stage dive gone wrong involving Ian Astbury of rock band The Cult, which made its way into the film. Many scenes from the movie were shot around the New York City area. The school portrayed in School of Rock is actually Main Hall at Wagner College in Staten Island, New York. In the DVD commentary, the kids say that all of the hallway scenes were shot in one hallway. One of the theaters used in many of the shots was at Union County Performing Arts Center located in Rahway, New Jersey.

Music

Soundtrack

The eponymous album was released on September 30, 2003. Sammy James Jr. of the band The Mooney Suzuki penned the title track with screenwriter Mike White, and the band backed up Jack Black and the child musicians on the soundtrack recording of the song. The film's director, Richard Linklater, scouted the country for talented 13-year-old musicians to play the rock and roll music featured on the soundtrack and in the film. The soundtrack includes "Immigrant Song" by Led Zeppelin, a band that has a very long history of denying permission for use of their songs in film and television. Linklater came up with the idea to shoot a video on the stage used at the film's ending, in which Jack Black begs the band for permission with the crowd extras cheering and chanting behind him. The video was sent directly to the living members of Led Zeppelin (Jimmy Page, Robert Plant and John Paul Jones), who granted permission for the song. The video is included on the DVD and Blu-ray.

Songs featured in the film

 "For Those About to Rock (We Salute You)" by AC/DC (Dewey uses the lyrics in a speech to the class)
 "Fight for Your Love" by No Vacancy*
 "Stay Free" by The Clash
 "Touch Me" by The Doors (Dewey sings this to Lawrence, who plays the keyboard part)*
 "Do You Remember Rock 'n' Roll Radio?" Ramones cover by Kiss
 "Sunshine of Your Love" by Cream*
 "Back in Black" by AC/DC
 Guitar riffs Dewey plays to Zack:
 "Iron Man" by Black Sabbath
 "Smoke on the Water" by Deep Purple
 "Highway to Hell" by AC/DC 
 "Substitute" by The Who*
 "The Greatest Love of All" by George Benson (Dewey mentions the lyrics as his reason for no testing)
 "Roadrunner" by The Modern Lovers
 "My Brain Is Hanging Upside Down (Bonzo Goes to Bitburg)" by Ramones*
 "The Wait (Killing Joke cover)" by Metallica
 "In the Ancient Times" by School of Rock
 "Sad Wings" by Brand New Sin
 "Mouthful of Love" by Young Heart Attack
 "Black Shuck" by The Darkness (on the CD soundtrack release this is switched to another Darkness track "Growing On Me" due to the amount of foul language in "Black Shuck".)
 "Immigrant Song" by Led Zeppelin*
 "Set You Free" by The Black Keys*
 "Edge of Seventeen" by Stevie Nicks*
 "Ballrooms of Mars" by T. Rex*
 "Moonage Daydream" by David Bowie
 "TV Eye" by The Stooges*
 "Ride into the Sun" by The Velvet Underground
 "Heal Me, I'm Heartsick" by No Vacancy*
 "School of Rock" by School of Rock*
 "It's a Long Way to the Top (If You Wanna Rock 'n' Roll)" by School of Rock* (featuring The Mooney Suzuki)
 "Math Is a Wonderful Thing" by Jack Black and Mike White*

* Featured on the Soundtrack album

Reception

Box-office performance
School of Rock opened at #1 with a weekend gross of $19,622,714 from 2,614 theaters for an average of $7,507 per venue. In its second weekend, the film declined just 21 percent, earning another $15,487,832 after expanding to 2,929 theaters, averaging $5,288 per venue, and bringing the ten-day gross to $39,671,396. In its third weekend, it dropped only 28 percent, making another $11,006,233 after expanding once again to 2,951 theaters, averaging $3,730 per venue, and bringing the 17-day gross to $54,898,025. It spent a total of six weeks among the Top 10 films and eventually grossed $81,261,177 in the United States and Canada and another $50,015,772 in international territories for a total gross of $131,282,949 worldwide, almost four times its budget of $35 million. This made School of Rock the highest-grossing music-themed comedy of all time, until it was overtaken in 2015 by Pitch Perfect 2.

Critical response
School of Rock received an approval rating of 92% on Rotten Tomatoes based on 200 reviews with an average rating of 7.70/10. The site's critical consensus reads, "Black's exuberant, gleeful performance turns School of Rock into a hilarious, rocking good time." On Metacritic, the film has a score of 82 out of 100, based on 41 critics, indicating "universal acclaim".

Rating the film 3.5 stars out of 4, Roger Ebert wrote that School of Rock "proves you can make a family film that's alive and well acted and smart and perceptive and funny—and that rocks."

Awards and nominations
The film was nominated for several awards, including Black receiving a Golden Globe Award nomination for Best Actor – Comedy or Musical (which he lost to Bill Murray for Lost in Translation), and winning an MTV Movie Award for Best Comedic Performance. In 2004, the film won Best Comedy Film at the British Comedy Awards.

Legacy

Possible sequel
In 2008, Jack Black said that a sequel was being considered. It was later reported that director Richard Linklater and producer Scott Rudin would return. Mike White was returning as screenwriter for the sequel, titled School of Rock 2: America Rocks, which picks up with Finn leading a group of summer school students on a cross-country field trip that delves into the history of rock 'n' roll. In 2012, Black stated that he believed the sequel was unlikely, saying, "I tried really hard to get all the pieces together. I wouldn't want to do it without the original writer and director, and we never all got together and saw eye-to-eye on what the script would be. It was not meant to be, unfortunately," but added, "never say never".

Stage adaptation

On April 5, 2013, Andrew Lloyd Webber announced that he had bought the rights to School of Rock for a stage musical. On December 18, 2014, the musical was officially confirmed and it was announced that the show would receive its world premiere on Broadway in autumn 2015, at the Winter Garden Theatre. It ultimately began previews on November 9, 2015, and opened on December 6, 2015. The musical has a book by Downton Abbey creator Julian Fellowes, and is directed by Laurence Connor, with choreography by JoAnn M. Hunter, set and costume design by Anna Louizos and lighting by Natasha Katz. The musical features an original score composed by Lloyd Webber, with lyrics by Glenn Slater and sound design by Mick Potter, in addition to music from the original film. School of Rock became Lloyd Webber's first show opening on Broadway before London since Jesus Christ Superstar in 1971. The stage adaptation eventually closed on January 20, 2019, having grossed $160,145,109 over the course of 1,309 performances.

10-year reunion
On August 29, 2013, a 10th-anniversary screening of the film was held in Austin, Texas, at the Paramount Theatre. Those in attendance included director Richard Linklater, Jack Black, Mike White, Miranda Cosgrove and the rest of the young cast members, except for Cole Hawkins (who played Leonard). Hosted by the Austin Film Society and Cirrus Logic, the event included a red carpet, a full cast and crew Q&A after the screening, where the now-grown child stars discussed their current pursuits in life, and a VIP after-party performance by the School of Rock band during which "School of Rock", "The Legend of The Rent", "Step Off" and "It's a Long Way to the Top (If You Wanna Rock 'n' Roll)" were played.

Television adaptation

On August 4, 2014, Nickelodeon announced that it was working with Paramount Television to develop a television show adaptation of the film. Production started in the fall and the series premiered in 2016. It starred Breanna Yde, Ricardo Hurtado, Jade Pettyjohn, Lance Lim, Aidan Miner and Tony Cavalero. The series adaptation of School of Rock ran for three seasons from March 12, 2016 to April 8, 2018.

Notes

References

External links

 
 
 
 
 
 

2003 films
2003 comedy films
2000s American films
2000s English-language films
2000s musical comedy films
2000s screwball comedy films
American rock music films
American musical comedy films
American screwball comedy films
Films about children
Films about educators
Films adapted into television shows
Films directed by Richard Linklater
Films produced by Scott Rudin
Films set in New York (state)
Films set in schools
Films shot in New Jersey
Films shot in New York (state)
Films with screenplays by Mike White
Paramount Pictures films
German comedy films
2000s German films